Chervona ruta is a flower featuring in Ukrainian legend.

Chervona Ruta may also refer to:
"Chervona Ruta" (song), a Ukrainian song written by Volodymyr Ivasyuk
Chervona Ruta (film), a 1971 Ukrainian television musical named after the eponymous song
Chervona Ruta (album), an album by Sofia Rotaru
Chervona Ruta (ensemble) (1971-1991), a Soviet Ukrainian music group around Sofia Rotaru
Chervona Ruta (festival) (1989–present), a biennually Ukrainian music festival